The Caniapiscau Reservoir is a reservoir on the upper Caniapiscau River in the Côte-Nord administrative region of the Canadian province of Quebec. It is the largest body of water in Quebec  and the second largest reservoir in Canada.

The Caniapiscau Reservoir, formed by two dams and forty-three dikes, is the largest reservoir in surface area of the James Bay Project. As headpond, it feeds the power plants of the La Grande complex in the winter and provides up to 35% of their production.

The reservoir was named after Lake Caniapiscau that was flooded during the formation of the reservoir. The name is an adaptation of the Cree or Innu toponym kâ-neyâpiskâw, which means "rocky point". Albert Peter Low had noted in 1895 that "a high rocky headland jutts into the lake." He probably referred to the northwest facing peninsula that gives the reservoir the shape of an arc as we current know it.

The Caniapiscau Reservoir is accessible by bush plane and, since 1981, by a gravel road from James Bay (the Trans-Taiga Road). At the very end of this road, near the Duplanter spillway, is the former worksite of the Société d'énergie de la Baie-James, named Caniapiscau. There is no permanent human habitation at the reservoir, but it is used by outfitters for seasonal hunting and fishing expeditions and by some Cree for subsistence fishing and trapping. It is isolated from society and there are very few gas stations or other services nearby.

History 

The natural lakes of the region were formed about nine thousand years ago as glaciers left Quebec after having scoured the Canadian Shield for ninety thousand years. The prototype of these lakes was an ice dam lake that drained southwards into the Gulf of Saint Lawrence at a time when areas further north (Nunavik) were still glaciated. As post-glacial rebound elevated the southern part of the Canadian Shield more rapidly than the north, the region began to drain northward into the Caniapiscau River, a tributary of the Koksoak River, and ultimately into Ungava Bay.

In 1834, the Hudson's Bay Company opened an outpost there to link its facilities in the James Bay region with those of Ungava Bay, but closed the Kaniapiskau Post in 1870.

In 1976, Société d'énergie de la Baie James, a subsidiary of Hydro-Québec, began construction on the Caniapiscau Reservoir, designed to feed the hydro-electric generating stations of the James Bay Project. Filling the reservoir began on October 25, 1981, and over the next three years it flooded numerous lakes such as Lakes Caniapiscau, Delorme, Brisay, Tournon, and Vermouille. It now fills a depression in the highest part of the Laurentian Plateau of the Canadian Shield, covering , or about four times the size of the natural lakes prior to impoundment.

Since August 1985, the Caniapiscau River was partially diverted to the west into the Laforge River of the La Grande River watershed, flowing west to James Bay.

Many new islands were created as a result of the lake's impoundment, and in 1997 Quebec's Commission de toponymie published a map naming those islands for significant works of Québécois literature. The names of the islands attracted controversy not only because they exclusively used French-language works, but also because Cree and Inuit First Nations leaders claimed that the sites already had native names, which were ignored and overwritten.

Flora 
The Caniapiscau Reservoir is in the zone of discontinuous permafrost. The area surrounding the reservoir is vegetated entirely with taiga, or boreal forest, characterized by widely spaced Black Spruce with a thick underlayer of yellow-grey lichen and interspersed with muskeg and bogs. In the more moist areas, some closed coniferous forest stands may appear. On the more exposed land, a forest-tundra transition zone occurs where the woodland is replaced by lichen dominated tundra.

See also

 List of lakes of Quebec
 Hydro-Québec
 James Bay Project
 List of Quebec rivers

References

Bibliography

External links
La Grande hydroelectric complex
HAYEUR, Gaëtan. 2001. Summary of Knowledge Acquired in Northern Environments from 1970 to 2000. Montreal: Hydro-Québec
World Lakes Database
Explo-Sylva
Air Saguenay Base on Lac Pau

Lakes of Nord-du-Québec
Lakes of Côte-Nord
Reservoirs in Quebec
James Bay Project
Canada geography articles needing translation from French Wikipedia